Samaniego is a town and municipality located in the province of Araba (Álava), in the Basque Country, northern Spain.

It forms part of the Rioja Alavesa wine region, and is located 10km west of Laguardia, 45km south of the provincial capital Vitoria-Gasteiz.

The primary industry of the town is winemaking, and a number of wineries are found within the village. The landscape is characterised by the extensive vineyards, and the Sierra de Cantabria mountain range which rises in the north of the municipality.

References

External links
 SAMANIEGO in the Bernardo Estornés Lasa - Auñamendi Encyclopedia (Euskomedia Fundazioa) 

Municipalities in Álava